Raccoon Island is a former island in Gallia County, Ohio, now submerged in the Ohio River.  It was located above the mouth of Raccoon Creek, in Clay Township, opposite the mouth of Crab Creek in Mason County, West Virginia.

Most islands in the Ohio River between Ohio and West Virginia belong to West Virginia, which was part of Virginia until 1863.  When Virginia ceded its claim to the Northwest Territory in 1784, it reserved control of the Ohio River along its borders, along with the submerged land to the low water mark on the Ohio shore.  The fact that Raccoon Island was part of Ohio means that at low water, the island was connected to Gallia County by land.  This may no longer be the case, as the construction of the Gallipolis Locks and Dam in 1937 permanently raised the level of the river, perhaps leading to the island's disappearance.

A United States Geological Survey topographical map from 1906 indicates that Raccoon Island was about a third of a mile long, and about five hundred feet wide.  It was closer to the Ohio side of the river than the West Virginia side.  The upper end was rounded, and the eastern side curved gently to the southern end, while the Ohio side was relatively straight.  The two sides converged at a narrow point.  The northern part of the island gradually sloped up to the highest point, about forty feet above the mean level of the river, while the western bank was relatively steep.  The USGS reports a village of the same name on the island at an elevation of 571 feet.

Hardesty's History of Gallia County mentions that "[a] post office was established, at a very early date upon Raccoon Island situated in the Ohio river, at the mouth of Raccoon creek."  The records of the United States Post Office Department indicate that William F. Gooldin was appointed postmaster at Raccoon Island on August 18, 1841; the last postmaster was Berton H. Ingels, appointed February 3, 1909.  The post office was discontinued, effective October 15, 1936, and the mail redirected to Gallipolis.  The island may have been rapidly eroding, or perhaps was being abandoned due to the planned construction of the Gallipolis Locks and Dam, which raised the height of the river.  By 1958, Raccoon Island was entirely submerged, and appears as a shoal in the Ohio River on USGS maps.  The elevation of 535 feet places it three feet under the mean level of the river, which is 538 feet at a point just below the southern tip of the island.

References

Islands of Ohio
Landforms of Gallia County, Ohio
Islands of the Ohio River